Women of Glamour is a 1937 American comedy film directed by Gordon Wiles and starring Virginia Bruce, Melvyn Douglas and Reginald Denny.

It is a remake of the 1930 film Ladies of Leisure, which was itself based on the 1926 silent film Ladies of Leisure. The film's sets were designed by the art director Stephen Goosson.

Main cast
 Virginia Bruce as Gloria Hudson 
 Melvyn Douglas as Richard 'Dick' Stark 
 Reginald Denny as Fritz 'Frederick' Eagan 
 Pert Kelton as Nan LaRoque 
 Leona Maricle as Carol Coulter 
 Thurston Hall as Mr. Stark 
 Mary Forbes as Mrs. Stark 
 Maurice Cass as Caldwell 
 Clarissa Selwynne as Woman

References

Bibliography
 Goble, Alan. The Complete Index to Literary Sources in Film. Walter de Gruyter, 1999.

External links
 

1937 films
1937 comedy films
American comedy films
Films directed by Gordon Wiles
Columbia Pictures films
Remakes of American films
American black-and-white films
1930s English-language films
1930s American films